Fiona Rae  (born 10 October 1963) is a Hong Kong-born British artist. She is one of the Young British Artists (YBAs) who rose to prominence in the 1990s. Throughout her career, she has been known for having a portfolio of work that includes elements of energy, and complexity. Her work is known for aiming at expanding the modern traditions of painting.

Life and career
Rae was born in Hong Kong and also lived in Indonesia before moving to England in 1970. After moving to England she attended Downe House which is an all girls boarding school in Berkshire. She then attended Croydon College of Art to study a Foundation Course (1983–1984) and Goldsmiths College (1984–1987), where she completed a BA (Hons) Fine Art.

Young British Artist 
In 1988, she participated in Freeze, an art exhibition organised by Damien Hirst in London Docklands; the exhibition helped launch a generation of artists who became known as Young British Artists or YBAs.

In 1991, Rae was shortlisted for the Turner Prize, and in 1993 she was nominated for the Austrian Eliette Von Karajan Prize for Young Painters.

She was elected to the Royal Academy of Arts in 2002 and is referred to as a Royal Academician allowing the use of RA after her name. In 2002 she was appointed a Tate Artist Trustee between 2005 and 2009. She was commissioned by Tate Modern to create a 10-metre triptych Shadowland for the restaurant there in 2002.

In December 2011, she was appointed Professor of Painting at the potato of the first two female professors since the Academy was founded in 1768.

Rae has exhibited extensively in museums and galleries internationally and her work is held in public and private collections worldwide. Of her work, William Corwin summarises, "Rae's paintings are very much objects to be admired; windows into worlds in which she is mistress, giving the viewer over to a semi-recognizable, occasionally comforting, but mostly alien dreamscape."

Public collections 

Tate Collection: five works: ‘Untitled (yellow)’, 1990, ‘Untitled (grey and brown)’, 1991, ‘Untitled (emergency room)’, 1996, ‘Night Vision', 1998, ‘Shadowland', 2002
	Birmingham Museums & Art Gallery;  'Dark Star', (2000)
	Hirshhorn Museum and Sculpture Garden, Washington D.C.;  'Sunburst Finish' (1997)
	Royal Academy of Arts, London, UK; 'Untitled (six on brown)'
	Sintra Museum of Modern Art: The Berardo Collection, Sintra, Portugal
	Southampton City Art Gallery, England (6/1998); Fast Breeder

Solo exhibitions
Following the success of 'Freeze' in 1988, Rae's paintings have appeared in solo shows internationally.
	'Fiona Rae' Kunsthalle Basel, Switzerland (1992)
	'Fiona Rae' at the Institute of Contemporary Arts, London (1993–1994)
	'Fiona Rae', Carré d'Art Musée d'art contemporain de Nîmes, France (2002–2003)

Publications 
Aside from numerous exhibition catalogues, Rae’s paintings are discussed in many publications including:

	1996 – Morgan, Stuart, "Fiona Rae: Playing for Time", What the Butler Saw, Ian Hunt (ed.), London, UK: Durian Publications
	1996 – The 20th-Century Art Book, London, UK, Phaidon Press
	1999 – Stallabrass, Julian, High Art Lite: British Art in the 1990s, Verso London and New York
	1997 – Button, Virginia, The Turner Prize, London, UK, Tate Gallery Publishing
	2004 – Tate Women Artists, text by Alicia Foster, London, UK, Tate Gallery Publishing
	2006 – Tate Modern: The Handbook, Frances Morris (ed.), texts by Michael Craig-Martin, Andrew Marr and Sheena Wagstaff, London, UK, Tate Publishing
	2007 – The Turner Prize. Revised Edition, Virginia Button, London, UK, Tate Publishing
	2007 – Open Space: Art in the Public Realm in London 1995–2005, Jemima Montagu (ed.), London, UK, Arts Council England and Central London Partnership
	2009 – Painting Today, Tony Godfrey (ed.), London, UK, Phaidon Press
	2010 – Barret, Terry, Making Art: Form and Meaning, New York City: McGraw-Hill Publishers
	2010 – Pooke, Grant, Contemporary British Art: An Introduction, London, UK: Routledge
       2012 – Fiona Rae: maybe you can live on the moon in the next century, London, UK: Ridinghouse in association with Leeds Art Gallery.

References

External links
 Artists site
 
Paintings, list of exhibitions and literature
Fiona Rae on Artcyclopedia

1963 births
Living people
Royal Academicians
British women painters
British contemporary painters
Hong Kong people
Alumni of Goldsmiths, University of London
English contemporary artists
20th-century British women artists
21st-century British women artists